Hemicordulia novaehollandiae is not formally recognized as a species of dragonfly by collections in Australia. It was originally described as being in the family Corduliidae from Nouvelle-Hollande (Australia) in 1871 by Edmond de Sélys-Longchamps, and the location of the holotype is unknown.

References 

Corduliidae
Insects described in 1871